The 2013–14 Hong Kong FA Cup preliminary round is the 39th edition of the Hong Kong FA Cup and the 1st edition of the Hong Kong FA Cup preliminary round. It will be the first time since the 2008–09 edition that lower divisions teams are involved in the competition. 4 teams from the preliminary round will be qualified for the proper round. The involvement of clubs from lower divisions means that the competition starts with a number of preliminary rounds. The 4 teams that reach preliminary semi-finals are qualified for the First Round proper of the 2013–14 Hong Kong FA Cup.

Calendar
The calendar for the 2013–14 Hong Kong FA Cup preliminary round, as announced by the Hong Kong Football Association.

'''Note: 
1 4 teams that reach preliminary semi-finals are qualified for the proper round of the cup. Therefore, the 3rd place playoff and the final do not affect the number of clubs remaining.

First round
10 out of 37 teams are randomly drawn and required to compete starting from the first round, while other 27 teams will start from the second round. The eight matches will all be played on 8 December 2013.

Second round
The second round draw included 5 first round winners and 27 teams that is not required to play in the first round. All second round matches will be played on 8 and 15 December 2013.

Third round
The third round draw saw 16 second round winners fighting for 8 quarter-finals place. All third round matches will be played on 22 December 2013.

Quarter-finals
The quarter-finals draw saw 8 third round winners fighting for 4 semi-finals place. All quarter-final matches will be played on 29 December 2013.

Semi-finals
The semi-finals draw saw 4 quarter-finals winners fighting for 2 final place. It is noted that these 4 teams have been qualified for the 2013–14 Hong Kong FA Cup main round. All semi-final matches will be played on 5 January 2014.

3rd Place Playoff

Final

References

External links
FA Cup - Hong Kong Football Association

Hong Kong FA Cup